The Dark Knight is a 2008 superhero film directed, produced, and co-written by Christopher Nolan. Based on the DC Comics character Batman, the film is the sequel to 2005's Batman Begins  and the second installment in Nolan's The Dark Knight Trilogy. In the film, Bruce Wayne/Batman (Christian Bale) forms an alliance with Police Lieutenant James Gordon (Gary Oldman) and District Attorney Harvey Dent (Aaron Eckhart) to dismantle organized crime in Gotham City, but are thwarted by a criminal mastermind known as the Joker (Heath Ledger) who seeks to undermine Batman's influence and create chaos in Gotham. The film also stars Michael Caine as Bruce Wayne's butler (Alfred Pennyworth), Maggie Gyllenhaal as Rachel Dawes, and Morgan Freeman as Lucius Fox. It was released in Australia on July 16, 2008.

The Dark Knight grossed over a billion dollars worldwide, becoming the fourth film in history to gross more than $1 billion worldwide and the highest-grossing film of 2008. It is currently the 47th highest-grossing film of all time. The Dark Knight also received a high critical acclaim, accumulating an approval rating of 94% on the review aggregator site Rotten Tomatoes.

The Dark Knight garnered numerous awards and nominations with particular praise for Heath Ledger's performance of the Joker. The film received eight Academy Award nominations at the 81st Academy Awards in 2009, winning two for Best Sound Editing and Best Supporting Actor (posthumously awarded to Ledger). Notably, the film's Best Sound Editing win prevented Best Picture winner Slumdog Millionaire from having a clean category-sweep.

At the People's Choice Awards—in which the winners are determined by the choices of the people (audience) in the Gallup polls—The Dark Knight won five awards, including: Favorite Movie, Favorite Action Movie, Favorite Superhero (Christian Bale as Bruce Wayne/Batman), Favorite On Screen Match-Up (Christian Bale and Heath Ledger), and Favourite Cast. The film was included in top-ten films of 2008 lists by multiple publications, including the American Film Institute and the National Board of Review.

In 2020, the film was selected for preservation in the United States National Film Registry by the Library of Congress for being "culturally, historically, or aesthetically significant".

Accolades

See also
 2008 in film

References

External links
 

Lists of accolades by film
Accolades